The 1980 USAC Championship Car season consisted of five races, beginning in Ontario, California on April 13 and concluding in Lexington, Ohio on July 13.  The USAC National Champion and Indianapolis 500 winner was Johnny Rutherford.  

CART and USAC united in 1980 under the banner of the Championship Racing League (CRL). The first five races of the season were run under CRL banner and sanction by USAC. The union dissolved after the Mid-Ohio race and USAC ended their season.

Schedule and results
In January 1980, USAC initially released a 10-race schedule, with new venues Talladega, Charlotte, and  Road Atlanta added to the schedule. However, these three events were eventually scrapped when USAC entered into a joint sanctioning effort with CART. But the sanctioning effort ended after 5 races, so the following races (NC) did not count to USAC championship but the CART championship. College Station, Talladega, Charlotte, Braselton, and Mosport were removed from the schedule entirely.

Final points standings

References

See also
 1980 Indianapolis 500
 1980 CART PPG Indy Car World Series

USAC Championship Car season
USAC Championship Car
1980 in American motorsport